"Otro Trago" (English: "Another Drink") is a song by Panamanian singer Sech featuring Puerto Rican rapper Darell, released as a single from Sech's debut album Sueños in April 2019 through Rich Music. It reached number one in Sech's native Panama, as well in Spain, Argentina, Peru, Paraguay, Honduras and the Dominican Republic. In the United States, the song debuted at number 100 on the Billboard Hot 100, later peaking at number 34, making Sech's first entry as a solo artist on the chart. Additionally, it became Sech's first chart-topper on the US Hot Latin Songs, making it the first Panamanian artist to reach number one on the chart.

On 26 June 2019, a remix featuring Nicky Jam, Ozuna, and Anuel AA was released.

Background
After topping the charts in several Spanish-speaking countries with the track, Sech was said to be a "challenger" to "música urbana's mainstays like Bad Bunny and Ozuna".

Composition and lyrics 
The song contains "urban fusion melodies" and an "R&B-meets-Reggaeton" beat, with Sech's "soothing vocals" layered on top, while assisted by featured artist Darell's "raspy urban voice". The song, which when translated means "Another Drink", narrates the "story of a girl drinking and dancing her sorrows away at [a] club".

Critical reception 
Billboard included the "Otro Trago" remix on their Best Songs of 2019 list, ranking it at number 70, while Complex named the original the 45th best song of 2019.

Music video
The music video premiered on Sech's YouTube channel on 26 April 2019. It currently has over 655 million views as of January 2023.

Charts

Weekly charts

Year-end charts

Certifications

See also
 List of Billboard Argentina Hot 100 number-one singles of 2019
 List of number-one singles of 2019 (Spain)
 List of number-one Billboard Hot Latin Songs of 2019

References

2019 singles
2019 songs
Number-one singles in Spain
Spanish-language songs
Argentina Hot 100 number-one singles
Nicky Jam songs
Anuel AA songs
Ozuna (singer) songs
Sech (singer) songs